Olsfors is a locality situated in Bollebygd Municipality, Västra Götaland County, Sweden. It had 623 inhabitants in 2010.

References 

Populated places in Västra Götaland County
Populated places in Bollebygd Municipality